Nectandra weddellii is a species of flowering plant in the family Lauraceae.

Distribution
The plant is endemic to Rio de Janeiro state in Southeastern Brazil.  It has been collected only from within a  radius of Rio de Janeiro city, in the Atlantic Forest ecoregion.

It is an IUCN Red List Endangered species, threatened by habitat loss.

References

weddellii
Endemic flora of Brazil
Flora of the Atlantic Forest
Flora of Rio de Janeiro (state)
Endangered flora of South America
Taxa named by Carl Meissner
Taxonomy articles created by Polbot